Rugby sevens was contested by nine teams at the 2006 Asian Games in Doha, Qatar on December 10 and 11. All games played at the Grand Hamad Stadium.

Schedule

Medalists

Qualification
As a limited number of teams could enter, The Asian Rugby Football Union announced 2005 Singer Sri Lankan Airlines Rugby 7's as the qualification event for the eight-team tournament. But later, they changed the decision and picked host nation Qatar and top 6 teams from 2002 edition, South Korea, Chinese Taipei, Thailand, Japan, China and Sri Lanka. For the last spot a qualification tournament was held in Hong Kong on 4 February 2006.

Later they added India to the competition to make it a nine-team tournament.

Draw

Pool A

Pool B

Pool C

Squads

Results
All times are Arabia Standard Time (UTC+03:00)

Preliminary round

Pool A

Pool B

Pool C

Summary

Classification 7th–9th

Classification 8th–9th

Classification 7th–8th

Classification 5th–6th

Final round

Semifinals

Bronze medal match

Gold medal match

Final standing

References

External links
Official website

 
rugby union
2006
2006 rugby sevens competitions
International rugby union competitions hosted by Qatar
2006 in Asian rugby union